The Runestone is an American 1991 adventure/horror film, the first film written and directed by Willard Carroll.  The film is an updating of the Ragnarok legend, with Fenrir being found in a runestone in Pennsylvania unearthed by archaeologists. The film is based upon the novel by Mark E. Rogers, which was published in a small press limited edition pamphlet.

Plot
Deep in a coal mine in Pennsylvania, a strange stone is found with Norse runes.  The stone is transported to New York City, where archaeologists investigate the mystery. Death and destruction follow, as one of the archeologists becomes possessed, and begins killing everyone around him.  Sam Stewart and wife Marla (Joan Severance) find it has some connection to their friend Martin. A young boy named Jacob (Chris Young) is haunted by terrifying nightmares of what is to come, and his uncle (William Hickey) explains these dreams through stories from Norse legend, which says that the only one who can destroy Fenrir is Týr, the Norse god of single combat, victory and heroic glory, who is prophesied to return to fight the creature. In the nick of time, the mystical Clockmaker (Alexander Godunov), who actually is Týr, one-handed Norse God of combat, begins fighting Fenrir. The film cast includes Peter Riegert as a Pez popping, cussing policeman, and features a cameo by Rick Marzan as a police officer named .

Cast
 Peter Riegert as Capt. Gregory Fanducci
 Joan Severance as Marla Stewart
 William Hickey as Lars Hagstrom
 Tim Ryan as Sam Stewart
 Mitchell Laurance as Martin Almquist
 Lawrence Tierney as Chief Richardson
 Dawan Scott as Fenrir
 Chris Young as Jacob
 Alexander Godunov as Sigvaldson, The Clockmaker
 Donald Hotton as Ask Franag
 Arthur Malet as Stoddard
 Rick Marzan as Strange

Release
The film was released on VHS and laserdisc in the United States by Live Home Video in 1991. As of 2011, the film has not been officially released on DVD.

Soundtrack
In March 2010, Perseverance Records released the soundtrack album with music by David Newman. The score was reminiscent of the 1950s B-movie scores composed by Henry Mancini such as Creature from the Black Lagoon and Tarantula.

References

External links

1991 films
1990s adventure films
Films directed by Willard Carroll
Films based on Norse mythology
Films set in Pennsylvania
1991 horror films
Films scored by David Newman
Hyperion Pictures films
Films with screenplays by Willard Carroll
Adventure horror films
1990s English-language films